Ballybentragh is a townland of 402 acres in County Antrim, Northern Ireland. It is situated in the civil parish of Grange of Nilteen and the historic barony of Antrim Upper.

History
The name of the townland was recorded variously as Ballinebantro in 1605 and Ballybentrogh in 1669.

See also 
List of townlands in County Antrim
List of places in County Antrim

References

Townlands of County Antrim
Civil parish of Grange of Nilteen